Passive-aggressive personality disorder, also called negativistic personality disorder, is characterized by procrastination, covert obstructionism, inefficiency and stubbornness. The DSM-5 no longer uses this phrase or label, and it is not one of the ten listed specific personality disorders. The previous edition, the revision IV (DSM-IV) describes passive-aggressive personality disorder as a proposed disorder involving a "pervasive pattern of negativistic attitudes and passive resistance to demands for adequate performance" in a variety of contexts. Passive-aggressive behavior is the obligatory symptom of the passive-aggressive personality disorder.

Causes 
Passive-aggressive disorder may stem from a specific childhood stimulus (e.g., alcohol/drug addicted parents, bullying, abuse) in an environment where it was not safe to express frustration or anger.  Families in which the honest expression of feelings is forbidden tend to teach children to repress and deny their feelings and to use other channels to express their frustration.  For example, if physical and psychological punishment were to be dealt to children who express anger, they would be inclined to be passive aggressive.

Children who sugarcoat hostility may have difficulties being assertive, never developing better coping strategies or skills for self-expression. They can become adults who, beneath a "seductive veneer", harbor "vindictive intent", in the words of Timothy F. Murphy and Loriann Oberlin. Alternatively individuals may simply have difficulty being as directly aggressive or assertive as others. Martin Kantor suggests three areas that contribute to passive-aggressive anger in individuals: conflicts about dependency, control, and competition, and that a person may be termed passive-aggressive if they behave so to few people on most occasions.

Diagnosis

Diagnostic and Statistical Manual 
With the publication of the DSM-5, this label has been largely disregarded. The equivalent DSM-5 diagnostic label would be "Other specified personality and unspecified personality disorder", as the individual may meet general criteria for a personality disorder, but does not meet the trait-based diagnostic criteria for any specific personality disorder (p645).

Passive-aggressive [personality disorder] was listed as an Axis II personality disorder in the DSM-III-R, but was moved in the DSM-IV to Appendix B ("Criteria Sets and Axes Provided for Further Study") because of controversy and the need for further research on how to also categorize the behaviors in a future edition. According to DSM-IV, people with passive-aggressive personality disorder are "often overtly ambivalent, wavering indecisively from one course of action to its opposite. They may follow an erratic path that causes endless wrangles with others and disappointment for themselves." Characteristic of these persons is an "intense conflict between dependence on others and the desire for self-assertion." Although exhibiting superficial bravado, their self-confidence is often very poor, and others react to them with hostility and negativity. This diagnosis is not made if the behavior is exhibited during a major depressive episode or can be attributed to dysthymic disorder.

ICD-10 
The 10th revision of the International Classification of Diseases (ICD-10) of the World Health Organization (WHO) includes passive-aggressive personality disorder in the "other specific personality disorders" rubric (description: "a personality disorder that fits none of the specific rubrics: F60.0–F60.7"). For this psychiatric diagnosis a condition must meet the general criteria for personality disorder listed under F60 in the clinical descriptions and diagnostic guidelines.

The general criteria for personality disorder includes markedly disharmonious behavior and attitudes (involving such areas of functioning as affectivity – ability to experience affects: emotions or feelings, involving ways of perceiving and thinking, impulse control, arousal, style of relating to others), the abnormal behavior pattern (enduring, of long standing), personal distress and the abnormal behavior pattern must be clearly maladaptive and pervasive. Personality disorder must appear during childhood or adolescence and continue into adulthood.

Specific diagnostic criteria of the passive-aggressive personality disorder in the "Diagnostic criteria for research" by WHO is not presented.

Millon's subtypes 
The psychologist Theodore Millon has proposed four subtypes of "negativist" ("Passive-aggressive"). Any individual negativist may exhibit none or one of the following:

Treatment 
Psychiatrist Kantor suggests a treatment approach using psychodynamic, supportive, cognitive, behavioral and interpersonal therapeutic methods. These methods apply to both the passive-aggressive person and their target victim.

History 
The first version of the Diagnostic and Statistical Manual of Mental Disorders (DSM-I), in 1952, listed "passive-aggressive", "passive-dependent", and "aggressive" types together under "Passive-aggressive personality". The three types were seen as manifestations of the same pathology, a "psychoneurotic reaction" to anxiety.

The DSM-III-R stated in 1987 that Passive-aggressive disorder is typified by, among other things, "fail[ing] to do the laundry or to stock the kitchen with food because of procrastination and dawdling."

It was not added in the DSM-5, with contributing factors of this decision including poor evidence for the validity of the diagnosis and poor internal consistency of diagnostic criteria.

References

Bibliography 
 .

External links 

Personality disorders